Mihov is a Bulgarian surname. Notable people with the surname include:

 Ilian Mihov, Bulgarian economist
 Ivan Mihov (born 1991), Bulgarian footballer
 Valentin Mihov (born 1954), former Bulgarian footballer

See also 
 Nikola Mikhov (1891–1945), regent of Bulgaria from 1943 to 1944
 Paskoje Miličević (Mihov) (ca. 1440–1516), Croatian architect

References 

Bulgarian-language surnames